The 2012 Belgian Grand Prix (formally the 2012 Formula 1 Shell Belgian Grand Prix) was a Formula One motor race that took place, at the Circuit de Spa-Francorchamps near the village of Francorchamps, Wallonia, Belgium on 2 September 2012, the first event after a five-week summer break. It was the twelfth race of the 2012 season, and the seventy-seventh running of the Belgian Grand Prix.

Jenson Button started from pole position and won the race. Sebastian Vettel finished second and Kimi Räikkönen third. The race featured a five-car collision at La Source, for which Romain Grosjean received a race ban.

This was the 300th race for Michael Schumacher.

Report

Background
Ferrari driver Fernando Alonso led the championship by forty points from Red Bull Racing's Mark Webber and Sebastian Vettel, with fourth-placed Lewis Hamilton a further seven points behind.

Tyre supplier Pirelli brought its silver-banded hard compound tyre as the harder "prime" tyre and the white-banded medium compound tyre as the softer "option" tyre.

Dani Clos replaced Narain Karthikeyan at HRT in the first practice session, while Valtteri Bottas drove Bruno Senna's Williams once again.

Free practice
The first free practice session began in wet conditions. Kamui Kobayashi ended the session fastest, having chosen to stay out early while other drivers pitted to begin work on their car setup. Ferrari's Felipe Massa failed to set a lap time when his car ground to a halt as he was about to enter the pits at the end of the installation lap. The second practice session saw even more rain fall, and large puddles of standing water on the circuit made running impractical. Only a handful of drivers set lap times, with Marussia's Charles Pic finishing the session fastest. The third and final session on Saturday morning was dry, allowing teams just one hour to complete as much of their testing programmes as possible ahead of qualifying and the race. Fernando Alonso went on to finish the session fastest.

Race

Accident
Pastor Maldonado let his clutch slip a fraction too soon and started his race before the lights had gone out, passing the Saubers. Grosjean made a good start and moved up to the inside of La Source, but in doing so, squeezed Hamilton between himself and the pitwall. The two touched wheels, both drivers losing control. Grosjean then speared into the back of Pérez and became airborne, crashing heavily into Alonso, missing Alonso's head by a few inches. Grosjean came to rest at the outside wall. Hamilton crashed into Kobayashi as well as Alonso after Grosjean's heavy impact. Pérez lost his rear wing from Grosjean's hit and touched Maldonado when the accident happened, making Maldonado spin. Only Kobayashi and Maldonado emerged from the crash, Kobayashi with a substantial hole in the side of his car. Kobayashi, who had started on the front row for Sauber, pitted after the accident and resumed in last place.

After the accident
Once Maldonado recovered from his spin he hit Timo Glock after the safety car restart. Narain Karthikeyan's HRT spun off backwards and hit into the tyre wall late in the race after a wheel came loose. After starting the race in 14th, Felipe Massa fought hard to get the fifth place, ahead of Red Bull’s Mark Webber. Bruno Senna had eighth position secured but due to a slow puncture he had to make a pitstop with only four laps left in the race, dropping him to 12th.

Button, who started on pole, was never under threat as Red Bull's Sebastian Vettel fought from 10th to 2nd, ahead of Lotus's Kimi Räikkönen.

Post-race
Romain Grosjean was fined €50,000 and was given a one-race ban at the Italian Grand Prix for his role in the crash at the start.

Pastor Maldonado was given two five-place grid penalties at the Italian Grand Prix, the first of which was for his jump start and the second for causing an avoidable collision with Glock.

Classification

Qualifying

Notes:
 — Pastor Maldonado received a three-place grid penalty for impeding Nico Hülkenberg in Q1.
 — Mark Webber and Nico Rosberg both received a five-place grid penalty for changing their gearboxes before the race.

Race

Championship standings after the race

Drivers' Championship standings

Constructors' Championship standings

 Note: Only the top five positions are included for both sets of standings.

See also 
 2012 Spa-Francorchamps GP2 Series round
 2012 Spa-Francorchamps GP3 Series round

References

2012 Formula One races
2012
Grand Prix
September 2012 sports events in Europe